The Bayer designation μ Chamaeleontis (Mu Chamaeleontis) is shared by two stars, in the constellation Chamaeleon:
μ1 Chamaeleontis
μ2 Chamaeleontis

Chamaeleontis, Mu
Chamaeleon (constellation)